The Rogier Tower is a skyscraper located in the Northern Quarter central business district of Brussels, Belgium. It owes its name to the Place Charles Rogier/Karel Rogierplein on which it is situated. It was formerly known as the Dexia Tower after Dexia bank, but that bank fell victim to the 2007–2012 global financial crisis and the tower's name was changed on 1 March 2012. As Dexia moved its offices in Brussels to the Bastion Tower in Ixelles, Belfius and its subsidiaries are the only occupants of this tower, often also called the Belfius Tower. It is the fourth tallest building in Belgium.

The Rogier Tower is built on the site of the Rogier International Centre, also called the Martini Tower, which was formerly the tallest building in Belgium, but was demolished in 2001. The Rogier Tower is also one of the few towers in Brussels whose roof is not horizontal, instead being made up of three inclined sections. It is also one of the only towers in the world to have a fully glass roof.

Lighting

The building has 6,000 windows, and 4,200 of these are equipped with an average of 12 light bulbs, each having a red, green and blue LED, allowing a broad palette of colours to be formed. These are lit up to form colourful displays, with each window acting as a pixel. To minimise power consumption, the LEDs only illuminate the outside of the closed blinds, and the reflection off the blinds illuminates the window.

Initially, the displays were just abstract patterns or the temperature, but on special occasions and major holidays, customised displays were shown. Following the late-2000s recession, the lighting was greatly reduced, and the displays were on for only 10 minutes an hour. As from 2015, Belfius reactivated the lighting, especially for special occasions such as the Belgian Pride, the Special Olympics, the Olympic Games, Rode Neuzen Dag (Red Nose Day), Viva for Life or the Belgian National Day on 21 July. Belfius was involved in several of these occasions as sponsor or as co-organiser.

See also

 Astro Tower
 Finance Tower
 North Galaxy Towers
 Madou Plaza Tower
 Proximus Towers
 World Trade Center (Brussels)

References

External links

Buildings and structures in Brussels
Skyscraper office buildings in Belgium
Saint-Josse-ten-Noode
Office buildings completed in 2006